Tim Bergin (born 29 July 1985) is an Irish rugby league footballer who has played in the 2010s.

Background
Tim Bergin was born in Abbeyleix, Republic of Ireland.

Playing career
On 3 November 2011 The annual RLIF Awards dinner was held at the Tower of London, and Bergin was named Ireland's player of the year.

On 6 October 2012, Bergin announced to his fans on Facebook that he was taking a break from the game to pursue other opportunities. Loverugbyleague.com announced on 21 January 2013 that Bergin has returned to the game and signed for University of Gloucestershire All Golds.

References

External links
(archived by web.archive.org) Sheffield Eagles profile

1985 births
Living people
Expatriate rugby league players in England
Gloucestershire All Golds players
Ireland national rugby league team players
Irish expatriate rugby league players
Irish expatriate sportspeople in England
Irish rugby league players
Rugby league players from County Laois
Rugby league wingers
Sheffield Eagles players